The Dickson Centre, located in the suburb of Dickson, is a group centre in the inner northern suburbs of Canberra.

The centre is the main commercial centre for the inner northern suburbs, after Civic, and is a significant site of employment. A range of businesses, services and community facilities are located there as well as a high school: Daramalan College.

Location 

Dickson Centre is located 3 km north of Civic along Northbourne Avenue at the northern end of the suburb of Dickson. It lies on the southern side of Antill Street and is bounded on the eastern side by Cowper Street.

Description 

Dickson Centre is the largest group centre in Canberra. It is structured as an outdoor pedestrian area with a ‘village square’ feel, without a mall or arcades.  There are a broad range of community facilities, restaurants, shops and offices.

The central area around Woolley Street is often referred to as Canberra's Chinatown, though, it has diversified to include Indian, Ethiopian, Italian, Japanese and South-East Asian restaurants as well as Chinese restaurants and grocers.

Community facilities are primarily at the eastern end, and include: the post office, swimming pool, playing fields, community health clinic, gymnasium, church and an ACT Ambulance Service station, which serves the inner northern suburbs.

The western side, approaching Northbourne Avenue, has large offices, which include: Telstra’s regional headquarters; TransACT; ACT Motor Registry; CanberraConnect; and the ACT Planning and Land Authority.

Other services include: a large newsagency, a health food shop, Jhay's shoe repairs, optometrist, a number of automotive repairers and small offices such as real estate agents and accountants.  As well as representation from many of the major national and international brands and franchises, such as: Woolworths, McDonald's, Shell, Westpac, Ali Baba, KFC, Blockbuster Video, TurkOz and Domino's Pizza.

Night venues include: Sub-Urban, a pub; Trinity, a cocktail bar; and The Tradies (The Dickson Tradesman's Union Club.)

Daytime meeting places and cafes include: Deli Marco, Sfoglia, Hudson's, Deek's, the Rainbow Hippie Place, Jumping Bean, Dickson Cakes, Elaine's Pies, TurkOz, Granny's Bakery and Dickson Library

Changes 
Zoning changes adopted as a result of the development of the Dickson Centre Master Plan, permit new buildings up to 12 metres (three storeys) high on the parking areas in Section 30 around the shopping centre, except for an area next to Antill street where 24 metre high buildings are permitted. In the area to its west and south (north of  Sullivans Creek and east of Challis Street, including the Woolley St area), 21 metre (six storey) high buildings are permitted. It is planned to build new Coles and Aldi supermarkets, 150 apartments and a 500-space parking garage on the parking area north of the current shops.

Transport 

Dickson Centre is primarily accessed by car. It is located at the corner of two major roads - Antill Street and Northbourne Avenue. These streets also intersect with Mouat Street, a major route to suburbs in northern Belconnen.

The centre is well served by buses running to surrounding suburbs and also further afield to Civic and Belconnen. Dickson Interchange south of Antill Street on Canberra's light rail line opened in April 2019 on Northbourne Avenue.

Northbourne Aviation Ground 

The area that became Dickson oval and Dickson shops was once an aerodrome in the early history of Canberra. On the side of the Dickson Library is a plaque which marks this, and reads:

Northbourne Aviation Ground
This plaque marks the site of Canberra's first aerodrome, which was declared operational on 4 March 1924. The first aviation fatality in the ACT occurred here on 26 February 1926. Aircraft operations continued at this site until November 1926 when they were transferred to a site on the western half of the present Canberra Airport.

Notes and references

Canberra urban places